The Incomplete Glenn Tilbrook (2001) was the first solo release by lead singer of Squeeze Glenn Tilbrook. This album featured Tilbrook's first recordings of songs written without his fellow Squeeze member Chris Difford. (While Squeeze never recorded a solo Tilbrook composition, The Rumour did so in 1981.)

The album received mainly positive reviews from Squeeze fans. Initial copies of the UK release also contain a bonus acoustic recording titled The Completely Acoustic Glenn Tilbrook featuring in-studio, acoustic recordings of the album's content.

The album was produced by Glenn Tilbrook and Andy Metcalfe.

Track listing 
All tracks composed by Glenn Tilbrook; except where indicated
 "This Is Where You Ain't"
  "Observatory" (Aimee Mann, Tilbrook)
  "Parallel World" (Chris Braide, Tilbrook)
  "Morning" (Chris Braide, Tilbrook)
  "One Dark Moment"
  "G.S.O.H. Essential"
  "Up the Creek"
  "Other World" (Ben Jones)
  "Interviewing Randy Newman"
 "You See Me" (Ron Sexsmith, Tilbrook)
 "I Won't See You" (Kim Stockwood, Tilbrook)
 "We Went Thataway"

External links 
AllMusic review

2001 debut albums
Albums produced by Glenn Tilbrook